Bhamba is a Khatri clan of the Punjab region of India and Pakistan. The Bhamba are Sikhs and Hindus in India and Muslim in Pakistan. Sikh and Hindu Bhambas migrated to India in 1947 after independence. After the arrival of Islam in the Punjab region many Bhambas converted to Islam and adopted the title Shaikh. Some of them in the North and North-West Pakistan also call themselves as 'Raja', 'Khan' and 'Sultan'. 

Hindu and Sikh Bhambas also trace their ancestral  hometown  specially to the areas of Bhamba Kalan in Kasur District which still has a population of Qanungoh Shaikh. In Pakistani Kashmir they are generally referred to as Bomba.

Bomba/bambas given a good numbers of warriors in hinduism and sikhism they support like a warrior and they look like a king and body also tall and smart

See also
 Bomba Dynasty
 Shaikh
 Shaikhs in South Asia
 Kashmiri Shaikh
 Punjabi Shaikh
 Khawaja Shaikh

References

Indian surnames
Surnames of Indian origin
Punjabi-language surnames
Hindu surnames
Khatri clans
Khatri surnames
Punjabi tribes
Social groups of Pakistan